Firebrace is a surname. Notable people with the surname include:

Aylmer Firebrace (1886–1972), British Royal Navy officer and fire chief
Sir Basil Firebrace, 1st Baronet (1652–1724), English politician
 Ginny Firebrace, aka Treahna Hamm, Australian artist, winner of National Indigenous Heritage Art Awards in 1996
Isaiah Firebrace (born 1999), Australian singer
Roy C. Firebrace (1889–1974), British army officer
Firebrace baronets